Vôi is a township (thị trấn) and capital of Lạng Giang District, Bắc Giang Province, in northeastern Vietnam.

References

Populated places in Bắc Giang province
Communes of Bắc Giang province
District capitals in Vietnam
Townships in Vietnam